Carychium is a genus of very small air-breathing land snails, terrestrial pulmonate gastropod mollusks in the family Ellobiidae.

Species
species within the genus Carychium include:
 
Carychium achimszulci Stworzewicz, 1999, Miocene
 Carychium antiquum Braun, 1843, Miocence 
 †Carychium apathyi Gaál, 1911, Miocene
 Carychium arboreum Dourson, 2012
Carychium belizeense Jochum & Weigand, 2017 
 †Carychium berellense Laubrière & Carez, 1880, Paleocene
 †Carychium bermudense Gulick, 1904, Pliocene
 †Carychium bigeminatum (Deshayes, 1863), Paleocene
Carychium biondii Paulucci, 1882
Carychium boysianum Benson, 1864 
Carychium carinatum Haufen, 1858 
 †Carychium cholnokyi Gaál, 1911, Miocene
Carychium clappi Hubricht, 1959
Carychium costaricanum Von Martens, 1898
 †Carychium cylindroides Staadt, 1913, Paleocene
Carychium cymatoplax Pilsbry, 1901
 †Carychium dhorni (Deshayes, 1863), Paleocene
 †Carychium euboicum Schütt, 1988, Miocene
 †Carychium eumicrum Bourguignat, 1857, Miocene
Carychium exiguum (Say, 1822)
Carychium exile H. C. Lea, 1842
 †Carychium fischeri Boettger, 1903, Oligocene 
Carychium floridanum Clapp, 1918
Carychium gibbum (Sandberger, 1875)
 †Carychium gracile Sandberger, 1875, Miocene
Carychium hachijoensis Pilsbry, 1902
Carychium hardiei Jochum & Weigand, 2017 
Carychium hellenicum Bank & Gittenberger, 1985
 †Carychium hypermeces Cossmann, 1889, Paleocene
Carychium ibazoricum Bank & Gittenberger, 1985
Carychium indicum Benson, 1849 
 †Carychium interferens (Deshayes, 1863), Paleocene
Carychium jardineanum (Chitty, 1853) 
Carychium javanum von Möllendorff, 1897 
Carychium lederi O. Boettger, 1880
Carychium loheri  von Möllendorff, 1898 
 †Carychium majus Boettger, 1870, Miocene
Carychium mariae Paulucci, 1878
Carychium mexicanum Pilsbry, 1891
 ?†Carychium michaudi (Boissy, 1848), Paleocene
 †Carychium michelini (Boissy, 1846), Paleocene
Carychium minimum ( O. F. Müller, 1774)
Carychium minusculum Gredler, 1887
 †Carychium moenanum Wenz, 1917, Oligocene
Carychium nannodes G. H. Clapp, 1905
 †Carychium nincki Cossmann, 1913, Eocene
Carychium nipponense Pilsbry & Hirase, 1904
Carychium noduliferum Reinhardt, 1877
 †Carychium nouleti Bourguignat, 1857, Miocene/Pliocene
Carychium occidentale Pilsbry, 1891
 †Carychium pachychilus Sandberger, 1875, Miocene
Carychium paganettii Zimmermann, 1925
Carychium panamaense Jochum, 2018 
Carychium pessimum Pilsbry, 1902 
 †Carychium pseudotetrodon Strauch, 1977, Miocene
 †Carychium puisseguri Truc, 1972, Pliocene
 Carychium pulchellum Freyer 1855,
 †Carychium quadridens (Andreae, 1884), Eocene
 †Carychium remiensis (Boissy, 1848), Paleocene
 †Carychium rhenanum Strauch, 1977, Pliocene
Carychium riparium Hubricht, 1978
 †Carychium sandbergeri Handmann, 1887, Miocene/Pliocene
 †Carychium schlickumi Strauch, 1977, Miocene/Pliocene
 †Carychium schwageri Reuss, 1868, Miocene
 ?Carychium sianicum Caziot, 1910, subrecent
Carychium sibiricum Gerstfeldt, 1859 
 †Carychium sparnacense Deshayes, 1863, Paleocene
 †Carychium starobogatovi Steklov, 1966, Miocene/Pliocene
Carychium stygium Call, 1897
 †Carychium suevicum Boettger, 1877, Miocene
 †Carychium surai Stworzewicz, 1999, Miocene
 †Carychium tetrodon (Paladilhe, 1873), Paleocene
Carychium thailandicum Burch & Panha, 1998
Carychium tianmushanense Chen, 1992
Carychium tridentatum (Risso, 1826)
 †Carychium vindobonense (Handmann, 1882), Pliocene
Carychium zarzaae Jochum & Weigand, 2017

References

Literature 
 R. A. Bank, E. Gittenberger: Notes on Azorean and European Carychium species (Gastropoda Basommatophora: Ellobiidae). In: Basteria. 49, Leiden 1985, S. 85–100.
 A. Jochum: Evolution and diversity of the troglobitic Carychiidae – A morphological and phylogenetic investigation of the terrestrial ellobiiod genera, Carychium and Zospeum. In: The Malacologist. 57, London 2011, S. 16–18. (PDF)
 F. Strauch: Die Entwicklung der europäischen Vertreter der Gattung Carychium O. F. Müller seit dem Miozän. In: Archiv für Molluskenkunde. 107 (4/6), Frankfurt am Main 1977, S. 149–193.
 A. M. Weigand, A. Jochum, R. Slapnik, J. Schnitzler, E. Zarza, A. Klussmann-Kolb: Evolution of microgastropods (Ellobioidea, Carychiidae): integrating taxonomic, phylogenetic and evolutionary hypotheses. In: BMC Evolutionary Biology. 13, 2013, S. 18. (biomedcentral.com, PDF; 2,7 MB)
 A. M. Weigand, M.-C. Goetze, A Jochum: Outdated but established?! Conchologically driven species delineations in microgastropods (Carychiidae, Carychium). In: Organisms Diversity and Evolution. 12, 2012, S. 377–386.
 J. C. Nekola, M. Barthel: Morphometric analysis of the genus Carychium in the Great Lakes region. In: Journal of Conchology. 37, 2002, S. 515–531.
 K. Bulman: Shell variability in Carychium tridentatum (Risso, 1826) and its importance for infraspecific taxonomy (Gastropoda, Pulmonata, Ellobiidae). In: Malakologische Abhandlungen des Museums für Tierkunde Dresden. 15, 1990, S. 37–50.
 A. M. Weigand, A. Jochum, R. Slapnik, J. Schnitzler, E. Zarza, A. Klussmann-Kolb: Evolution of microgastropods (Ellobioidea, Carychiidae): integrating taxonomic, phylogenetic and evolutionary hypotheses. In: BMC Evolutionary Biology. 13, 2013, S. 18 (biomedcentral.com PDF; 2,7 MB)
 O. F. Müller: Vermivm terrestrium et fluviatilium, seu animalium infusoriorum, helminthicorum et testaceorum, non marinorum, succincta historia. In: Voluminis Imi pars Ima. 1773, S. [1-33], 1–135. Havniæ & Lipsiæ. (Heineck & Faber).

References

External links 
 Worldwide mollusc species data base</ref>
 Müller, O. F. (1773-1774). Vermium terrestrium et fluviatilium, seu animalium infusoriorum, helminthicorum, et testaceorum, non marinorum, succincta historia. Vol. 1, Pars Ima: 1-136 [1773]; Pars Altera: 1-214 + index 8 pp. [1774]. Havniæ (Copenhagen) & Lipsiæ (Leipzig), Heineck & Faber
 61-63. Pilsbry H. A. (October) 1894. The American species of Carychium. The Nautilus, 8(6)]

Ellobiidae